This is a list of navies, present and historical.

List of navies, by country 
Navies for all present countries are shown below.

Historical navies

See also 
 Command of the sea
 Coast guards
 Maritime republics
 Maritime power
 Thalassocracy
 List of militaries by country
 List of armies by country
 List of aircraft carriers
 List of air forces
 List of space forces, units, and formations
 List of gendarmeries
 List of submarine classes in service
 List of naval ship classes in service
 Navies of landlocked countries
 List of countries by level of military equipment

References

 
 
Navies
.Navies